Chandra Pal (born 1950) is Indian legal education administrator, jurist presently working in Baba Mast Nath University as professor. He has previously worked as Head and Dean of the Law Department, Maharishi Dayanand University, Rohtak, India. He has been distinguished invitees, Chief Guest, Guest of honor in various universities. The Prof. C.P. Sheoran, has published three books and 140 research papers and book reviews. He has guided many Ph.D.'s. He has participated and organised many seminars and conferences.  He is alumni of Kurukshetra University. He was awarded Ph.D. in 1980 PG (LL.M.) in 1974, UG(LL.B.) in 1972 and (B.Sc.) in 1969 Kurukshetra University, Rohtak.

Career
He was Director of Distance Education, MDU, Rohtak in 2005. In 1993 has worked as Registrar of M.D. University, Rohtak. During 1993–1996 Dean, Faculty of Education, M.D. University, Rohtak. Proctor and Dean, Law Faculty, M.D. University Rohtak during (1995–1998, 2001–2004), Head, Law Department, M.D. University, Rohtak (1994–1997, 2002–2005, 2007–2010). He was member of various academic bodies including Member, Executive Council Mizoram Central University, Aizawal.

Books
 
 
 
 Human Rights in 21st Century : National And International Perspectives.
 Fiscal Federalism and Union State Fiscal Relations: Current Issues and Trends.

References

1950 births
Living people
Deans of law schools in India
20th-century Indian educational theorists
Indian academic administrators
Indian legal scholars